The England cricket team toured Australia during the 1990–91 cricket season to compete in a five-match Test series against Australia for the Ashes. While in Australia, England also played a number of tour matches against state and representative teams, and competed in the one-day international (ODI) World Series Cup against Australia and New Zealand. At the conclusion of the tour, England flew to New Zealand to participate in a three-game ODI series.

Under the captaincy of Graham Gooch, England were unable to regain the Ashes, losing the series 3–0.

Touring squad 
The England squad flew out to Australia on 18 October 1990. The personnel was vastly different due to the turbulent years that had followed the previous tour to Australia, which had been won 2–1 under Mike Gatting, who had chosen to captain an England XI on a rebel tour of South Africa and subsequently had been banned from Test cricket for three years. Following the humiliation of the 1989 Ashes series defeat, Graham Gooch replaced David Gower as captain and although England continued their streak of series defeats against West Indies (going down 2–1 after winning the First Test), they won back much respect, and then followed up with series wins against India and New Zealand during the home summer. 

As a result, although the initial squad contained a number of inexperienced Test players (only five squad members – Gooch, Gower, Allan Lamb, Gladstone Small and Eddie Hemmings – had been on earlier tours of Australia), journalists such as former Test cricketer Mike Selvey (writing for The Guardian at the time) felt somewhat confident that England could match it with the Australians.   

 Graham Gooch (c) (Essex)
 Allan Lamb (vc) (Northamptonshire)
 Michael Atherton (Lancashire)
 Wayne Larkins (Northamptonshire)
 David Gower (Hampshire)
 Robin Smith (Hampshire)
 John Morris (Derbyshire)
 Alec Stewart (wk) (Surrey)
 Jack Russell (wk) (Gloucestershire)
 Chris Lewis (Leicestershire)
 Eddie Hemmings (Nottinghamshire)
 Phil Tufnell (Middlesex)
 Angus Fraser (Middlesex)
 Devon Malcolm (Derbyshire)
 Gladstone Small (Warwickshire)
 Martin Bicknell (Surrey)

Phillip DeFreitas (Lancashire) Hugh Morris (Glamorgan) and Phil Newport (Worcestershire) received subsequent call-ups to cover or replace injured players.

As on the previous Australian series, the tour was managed by Peter Lush, while Micky Stewart was team manager.

Test series summary

1st Test

2nd Test

3rd Test

4th Test

5th Test

Tour matches

October
 25 - WACA President's XI - Lilac Hill, Perth, Western Australia - England won by 6 wickets
 30 - Western Australia Combined XI - Perth, Australia - WAC XI won by 3 wickets

November
 2-5 - Western Australia - Perth, Western Australia - match drawn
 9-12 - South Australia - Adelaide, South Australia - South Australia won by 6 wickets
 14 - Tasmania - Hobart, Tasmania - England won by 8 wickets
 16-19 - An Australian XI - Hobart, Australia - match drawn

December 
 4 - Prime Minister's XI - Canberra, Australian Capital Territory - PM's XI won by 31 runs
 20-23 - Victoria - Ballarat, Victoria - match drawn

January
 13-16 - New South Wales - Albury, New South Wales - NSW won by 6 wickets
 19-22 - Queensland - Carrarra, Queensland - England won by 10 wickets

World Series Cup
England also played in the World Series Cup triangular tournament with Australia and New Zealand. England finished third in the table not qualifying for the finals.

December
1 v New Zealand, Adelaide Oval - New Zealand by 7 runs
7 v New Zealand, WACA, Perth - England by 4 wickets
9 v Australia, WACA, Perth - Australia by 6 wickets
13 v New Zealand, Sydney Cricket Ground - England by 33 runs
15 v New Zealand, Gabba, Brisbane - New Zealand by 8 wickets
16 v Australia, Gabba, Brisbane - Australia by 37 runs

January
1 v Australia, Sydney Cricket Ground - Australia by 68 runs
10 v Australia, Melbourne Cricket Ground - Australia by 3 runs
England failed to qualify for the finals.

External sources
 CricketArchive – tour itinerary

Annual reviews
 Playfair Cricket Annual 1991
 Wisden Cricketers' Almanack 1991

Further reading
 Chris Harte, A History of Australian Cricket, Andre Deutsch, 1993

References

1990 in Australian cricket
1990 in English cricket
1990–91 Australian cricket season
1991 in Australian cricket
1991 in English cricket
1990-91
International cricket competitions from 1988–89 to 1991
1990-91